Polygireulima is a genus of very small parasitic sea snails, marine gastropod mollusks or micromollusks in the Eulimidae family.

This genus was first described as Acicularia by Monterosato in 1884, a name ruled invalid as a homonym of several prior names. In 1984, Anders Warén's "A generic revision of the family Eulimidae (Gastropoda, Prosobranchia)" synonymised Acicularia with Federico Sacco's 1892 description of Polygireulima.

Species
Species within the Polygireulima genera include:
 † Polygireulima deshayesi (Cossmann, 1888) 
Polygireulima rutila Carpenter, 1864
 † Polygireulima spina (Grateloup, 1838) 
Species brought into synonymy
Polygireulima amblytera Verrill & Bush, 1900: synonym of Melanella amblytera (Verrill & Bush, 1900)
A parasite of echinoderms, existing in subtidal habitats in the Atlantic Ocean and Caribbean Sea.
 Polygireulima monterosatoi (Monterosato, 1890): synonym of Melanella pyramidalis (G. B. Sowerby II, 1866)
 Polygireulima polita (Linnaeus, 1758): synonym of Melanella polita (Linnaeus, 1758)

References

 Warén A. (1984) A generic revision of the family Eulimidae (Gastropoda, Prosobranchia). Journal of Molluscan Studies suppl. 13: 1-96.

External links 

Eulimidae